Demodex injai is a hair follicle mite in the domestic dog.

References

Trombidiformes
Animals described in 2003
Dog diseases